The Capon Oak Tree is one of the last surviving trees of the ancient Jedforest, close to Jed Water, a small river which has cut a course below soft sandstone cliffs.  
The Capon Tree is held together with concrete, bricks and timber beams supporting its trunk and branches due to a massive split down the middle of the trunk. The tree continues to grow. 

Trees are being replanted in the Borders to establish a renewal of the ancient 'Caledon Wood,' or great northern forest, which included Ettrick Forest and Jedforest.

See also
 List of Great British Trees

References

External links

Recorded information about the Capon Oak on the Ancient Tree Hunt
Jedburgh
SNH

Individual oak trees
Individual trees in Scotland
Jedburgh